Yan Ta Khao is a district (amphoe) of Trang province, Thailand.

Geography
Neighboring districts are (from the south clockwise): Palian, Kantang, Mueang Trang and Na Yong of Trang Province; Srinagarindra and Kong Ra of Phatthalung province.

History
The minor district (king amphoe) Yan Ta Khao was created on 1 January 1948 as a subordinate of Kantang district. Originally it consisted of six tambons: Yan Ta Khao, Nong Bo, and Thung Khai were split off from Kantang District, Na Chum Het from Mueang Trang District, and Nai Khuan and Phrong Chorakhe from Palian District. It was upgraded to a full district on 5 June 1956.

Administration
The district is divided into eight sub-districts (tambons), which are further subdivided into 65 villages (mubans). Yan Ta Khao is a township (thesaban tambon) which covers parts of tambon Yan Ta Khao. There are further eight tambon administrative organizations (TAO).

References

External links
amphoe.com

Districts of Trang province